Zhangjiajie, also known in Tujia language as Zhangx jif avlar /dzaŋ˩ ji˥ a˩.la˥/, is a prefecture-level city in the northwestern part of Hunan Province, China. It comprises the district of Yongding, Wulingyuan and counties of Cili and Sangzhi. It contains the Zhangjiajie National Forest Park, part of the Wulingyuan Scenic Area which was designated as a UNESCO World Heritage Site in 1992 by the China National Tourism Administration.

History

The city itself was previously named Dayong and has a recorded history dating back to 221 BC. People lived here along both banks of the Lishui River (the mother river in Zhangjiajie), now within the boundaries of Zhangjiajie City, very early during the Stone Age. Human settlement in this region dates back 100,000 years, rivaling famous sites such as Xi'an, Beijing and others. In 1986, the Academy of Chinese Social Science discovered Stone Age relics in Cili County, unearthing 108 articles of stoneware; mostly tapered-form, hacked-tamped and plate-shaped works. Shortly thereafter, in 1988, the Archaeological Institute of the Hunan Province found other relics in Sangzhi County, including three pieces of stoneware that were estimated to have been fashioned over around the same time period.

Ten thousand years ago, those who lived within the boundaries of what is now Zhangjiajie City employed fire to bake pottery. Archaeologists have found more than 20 relics of this kind in the Cili County. While in Sangzhi County, a black clay pot adorned with a unique design was unearthed dating back ten thousand years. During that period, this pottery-firing technique was the most advanced in China. These technological advancements in the fashioning of stone tools and pottery would seem to indicate a highly developed culture in this region. However, the society which developed only endured briefly before waning and being superseded by other regional powers. This seems understandable in view of Zhangjiajie's remote geographical position, its undeveloped land and river transportation and its mountainous terrain making cultivation difficult. For these reasons, Zhangjiajie has been labeled "the Land of the Savage Southern Minority" since the earliest recorded history. Additional name descriptors have been the "Wuling Rude People" and "Tujia Rude People", indicative of discriminatory views held against the regional culture.

Origin of the name

The new name of Zhangjiajie City was adopted in 1994, after the National Forest Park in the Wulingyuan Scenic Area in order to give it more prominence and after this site had been designated a UNESCO World Heritage Site in 1992. The National Forest Park had been given the name of Zhangjiajie after the name of a small village located within its bounds and now a popular tourist attraction within the park. The three-character name can be interpreted as follows: "Zhang" is a common surname in China; "jia" can be translated as "family" and "jie" can be translated as "homeland", giving the completed translation of "Zhang family homeland." It has been reported that at least one tourist guide has said that the name may have been chosen to convey the idea or impression of "Open the family door to welcome the world", but this is not the locally accepted and directly-translated meaning of the name. The official version of its name is linked to a Han general and advisor, Zhang Liang, who resettled in the area after a suspicious Liu Bang, the founder of Han dynasty, started to persecute his staffs and generals who had contributed to his becoming emperor. It was so named to signify that the Zhang family had set up home there.

"jie" in the city has two meanings: one refers to the boundary of ownership, the other refers to high mountains. The Daoguang edition of the Qing Dynasty "Annals of Yongding County" contained: "Wudong Stream originated in Zhangjiajie." Republic of China edition of "Cili County records" contained: "Suoxi from Zhangjiajie." Here Zhangjiajie, refers to the Zhangjiajie National Forest Park area. Zhangjiajie's name, the earliest in the Ming Chongzhen four years (1631) "Zhang Genealogy" preface. The preface was written by Zhang Zaichang, the sixth grandson of Zhang Wancong, commander of Yongding Wei Dayong Office. During the reign of Hongzhi of the Ming Dynasty (1488-1506), the imperial court, seeing Zhang Wancong's meritorious service in guarding the town, awarded him the "mountain land" around the Zhangjiajie National Forest Park as a fief. He then moved his family up the mountain to maintain the business. Ming Chongzhen three years (1630), the sixth generation of Zhang Wancong's grandson Zhang Zaihong was given a regiment officer, and set up a government office here. This area became the hereditary territory of the Zhang family, called "Zhangjiajie".

Climate

Administrative subdivisions
Zhangjiajie administers two districts and two counties.

Yongding District (which contains the central, built-up area of Zhangjiajie city)
Wulingyuan District
Cili County
Sangzhi County

Government

The current CPC Party Secretary (chief) of Zhangjiajie is Guo Zhenggui and the current Mayor is Liu Ge'an.

Transportation 
The Zhangjiajie Hehua International Airport services scheduled service to major airports in China. There are domestic flights available between Zhangjiajie and other cities, such as Changsha, Beijing, Shanghai, Guangzhou, etc. Flights between Zhangjiajie and Seoul and Busan are also available.

Rail
Zhangjaijie is served by two railway stations. Zhangjiajie railway station is on the Jiaozuo–Liuzhou railway. Zhangjiajie West railway station opened in 2019 on the Qianjiang–Changde railway.

Roads 
Due to tourism, the G5513 Changsha–Zhangjiajie Expressway links provincial capital Changsha and Zhangjiajie.

International relations

Twin towns — Sister cities
Zhangjiajie is twinned with:

  Hadong County, South Gyeongsang, South Korea (2006)  
  Santa Fe, New Mexico, United States (2009)  
  Naruto, Tokushima, Japan (2011)
  Arouca, Metropolitan Area of Porto, Portugal (2017)

References

External links 

Zhangjiajie tourism information website
 Zhangjiajie city government Web site

 
Cities in Hunan
Prefecture-level divisions of Hunan
AAAAA-rated tourist attractions